The Doll's Hospital was a toy shop at 16 Dawes Road, Fulham, London.

In the 1937 Kelly's Directory, no 16 was listed a s a toy shop, along with with toy dealer Albert. E. Wickes. It acquired an international reputation for its doll repair and restoration workshop, and elicited covergae in the Illustrated Sydney News, "Patients are admitted for broken heads, or fractured limbs, loss of hair, eyes, nose, teeth, fingers, hands, toes, and wasting away of the body. Operations take place every day between 9am and 8pm."

In February 1948, the owners, Dr Archibald Henderson and his wife Rose vanished without trace. They had become the penultimate victims of serial killer John Haigh, known as the "Acid Bath Murderer", as he dissolved bodies in concentrated sulphuric acid. Haigh invited them to his workshop in Crawley where he shot them with a revolver stolen from Henderson's house.

References

Fulham